Robert Allan Brown (1849–1931) was a well-known and flamboyant prospector and speculator in 19th and early 20th Century in the Canadian province of British Columbia. He was known generally as Volcanic Brown, especially in the province's Kootenay and Boundary districts and in adjoining Eastern Washington, and also as Sunset Brown in the Similkameen District and still also to others as Crazy Brown. His enthusiastic nature contributed to his nickname, and as result of that and his flamboyant personality he was a fixture in mining industry news in a wide region which spanned the British Columbia-United States border.

Brown was prominent in the Boundary Country and Inland Empire mining industries, in capacities ranging from being a notable and very successful prospector through to being a speculator, promoter and investor, and also the founder of Volcanic City, one of the many short-lived mining and smelting towns of the Boundary Country. He was a presence in many mining districts throughout the region  and led the way in discoveries of several important orebodies, although he never became wealthy.

Name origin
Brown's name derived from his theory that the richest copper deposits in the region had not yet been located, and believed it would be found in abundance where there had been volcanic activity, so spent much of his life searching the Boundary Country for that evidence.

Demise
In later years, he took up the story of the fabled lost goldmine near Pitt Lake and is believed to have died in the country beyond the upper valley of the Pitt River. A camp was found at the foot of the Stave Glacier, at the head of the Stave River, the next basin east of the Pitt's upper course with a glass jar containing 11 ounces of gold, but no remains were found, not even his solid gold dentures.

Legacy

Other than Volcanic City, other places named for Volcanic Brown include Volcanic Creek and Brown Creek, which enter the Granby River 15 km upstream from the town of Grand Forks, near the site of Volcanic City.

References

Pre-Confederation British Columbia people
Canadian miners
Canadian prospectors
History of Washington (state) 
Kootenays
Similkameen Country
Boundary Country
1849 births
1931 deaths